Lawfare is a form of war consisting of the use of the legal system against an enemy. Lawfare may also refer to:

 Lawfare (blog), a blog about national security law of United States
 Lawfare Project, a litigation fund defending Jewish civil rights

Law of war